The white-bellied robin-chat (Cossyphicula roberti) is a species of bird in the family Muscicapidae. It is monotypic within the genus Cossyphicula. It is found in western Cameroon, Bioko and the Albertine Rift montane forests. Its natural habitats are subtropical or tropical moist lowland forest and subtropical or tropical moist montane forest.

References

white-bellied robin-chat
Birds of the Gulf of Guinea
Birds of Central Africa
white-bellied robin-chat
Taxonomy articles created by Polbot